Icehouse Ventures is a New Zealand-based venture capital firm. The firm is headquartered in Auckland and mainly focuses on the technology industry and has backed 200 companies. The firm also operates a variety of angel groups networks such as Ice Angels and Arc Angels. Icehouse Ventures was formally founded in 2019 as a separate company but had operated as part of the Icehouse group since 2001. In 2019, the founding CEO of the Icehouse stepped down as CEO and joined the board of directors of Icehouse Ventures.

Icehouse Ventures receives funding from government agency Callaghan Innovation to provide a founder incubator service to the founders of new startup businesses in New Zealand.

History 
The Icehouse was founded in 2001 with a mandate to encourage innovation and entrepreneurship in New Zealand. The organisation was a joint venture between Auckland University and private sector partners. To also support innovation and entrepreneurship by connecting existing SME businesses with new startups the group also added a coworking space, business incubator, and angel network. The group hosted and operated the first Lightning Lab cohorts in Auckland in 2015 and 2016.

The organisation has managed and operated the Ice Angels angel network since 2001. In 2015, the organisation added an internship programme for young students interested in angel investing and venture capital. In 2016, the student programme was expanded into a student-led venture capital fund called Firstcut Ventures, that is managed by Icehouse Ventures in partnership with a group of university students. The fund invests in founders under 30.

Icehouse Ventures was spun out of the Icehouse in 2019 and received external investment into the operating company from 44 investors including KiwiSaver operator Simplicity. Venture capital funds were also added such as the Tuhua Fund and Eden Fund.

In April 2020, Stuff published an article critical of support that the Eden Fund investor network (operated by Icehouse Ventures) had provided to communities in China impacted by COVID-19. The article was found by the Media Council to be inaccurate and unfair.

In September 2020, Icehouse Ventures acquired a stake in the research and development incubator Level Two which works with deep-tech and Clean technology companies. Icehouse Ventures operates the Level Two fund and provides nominee, investment operations and funds management to Level Two.

In 2022, Icehouse Ventures created a special fund to invest in female-founded and led ventures.

Investments 
Icehouse Ventures invests in early-stage private companies. It specialises in incubation, seed stage, startup stage, early stage, and growth stage investments in private companies. The firm also operates funds that invest in later stage companies by using the pro rata rights gained during earlier investments.

References

External links 
 

Venture capital firms
Companies based in Auckland
New Zealand companies established in 2019
Software companies of New Zealand